St Mary's Church, Handsworth, also known as Handsworth Old Church, is a Grade II* listed Anglican church in Handsworth, Birmingham, England. Its ten-acre (4 hectare) grounds are contiguous with Handsworth Park. It lies just off the Birmingham Outer Circle, and south of a cutting housing the site of the former Handsworth Wood railway station. It is noteworthy as the resting place of famous progenitors of the industrial age, and has been described as the "Cathedral of the Industrial Revolution".

History
Despite the church's strong Industrial Revolution connections, the earliest parish register for St Mary's (held at the Library of Birmingham) commences in 1558; while the first stone church building was erected on the site around 1160. This was a small and austere Norman structure, occupying about half of the present south aisle. The church's few surviving Norman features can be seen at the lower stages of the sandstone tower at the original church's east end.

In its long history, St Mary's has undergone successive and opinionated reconstruction, especially in 1820 and 1870. As a Staffordshire country church placed at the convergence of several cross country tracks, St Mary's became a significant part of the largest industrial city in Britain.

In his 1851 History, Gazetteer and Directory of Staffordshire, William White records:

Handsworth Church, St Mary, is picturesquely situated on the Hamstead road, about two miles (3 km) NNW of Birmingham. It is an ancient structure, partly rebuilt and enlarged in 1820, and has a tower with six bells, which like the other remaining parts of the ancient fabric, is in the decorated style of the time of Edward III. In the chancel are two recumbent effigies of members of the Wyrley family, and an ancient piscena. On the south side, a neat groined chapel has been raised over the vault of the late celebrated engineer, James Watt, Esq, of whom there is in the chapel a beautiful white marble statue, by Chantrey. Among the numerous mural monuments in the church is one in memory of the late Matthew Boulton, Esq, of Soho. The rectory is in the patronage of the Rev John Peel, DD, and the Rev George William Murray, MA, is the incumbent.

In 1894, part of the parish was taken to form a new parish for St Paul's Church, Hamstead. Handsworth parish was transferred from Staffordshire to Warwickshire in 1911. The celebrated artist George Willis-Pryce painted a view of the church from across a swan-lake at this time. The rectory to which White refers was demolished in the 1890s to make way for the large pond of Handsworth Park and at the start of the 21st century it is more accurate to describe St Mary's as situated on Hamstead Road in the Victorian suburb of Handsworth, in the Birmingham electoral ward of Lozells and East Handsworth; and, since 1974, the West Midlands county.

Plans to end the neglect of the Churchyard
Since the 1970s, St Mary's churchyard has bordered on dereliction. It is a closed graveyard, with the apparently empty spaces to the south of the graveyard harbouring the final resting places of numerous paupers whose names are recorded in the Church Register but whose remains were interred without coffins or visible memorials, beyond the unevenness of the overgrown ground above them. The condition of the churchyard-—as a place that feels unsafe to some, whose memorials have become inaccessible to many, their inscriptions overgrown with ivy, headstones broken, unstable or unreachable through the surrounding undergrowth—-is recognised as a reproach to all who know the place. Even so, to those who enter the lime avenues long being kept clear of encroaching undergrowth, this wilderness contains mystery and beauty as well as melancholy. It is intended that planned improvements in the accessibility and appearance of the graveyard will be ones that restore it to respect in Handsworth, without lessening its serenity or its qualities as a haven for wildlife next to Handsworth Park. It is intended it should become a safer place, a more attractive place and a place of education for visitors of all ages. To this end there has been a marked increase in voluntary work in the graveyard while local community leaders have voted neighbourhood renewal funds that they hope will be matched by other regional agencies to implement a plan drawn up by the City Council's Landscape Practice Group to end years of neglect and bring about a rejuvenation similar to the great improvements they have funded in the neighbouring park between 2000 and 2006.

St Mary's then incumbent was Canon Brian A. Hall who in March 2006 became chairman of a new group called The Friends of St Mary's Churchyard, which aimed "to be a focus for future hopes for the integrity of St Mary's Churchyard as a special place" – special not only for the respect accorded to the dead which ought to apply to all graveyards, but also because of the association of the church and its grounds with the founding fathers of the industrial age, and more recently with two important figures in the development of football, William McGregor, Director of Aston Villa F.C., who organised the founding meeting of the Football League on 22 March 1888, and George Ramsay, whose headstone reads "Founder of Aston Villa".

Boulton, Watt & Murdoch memorials
James Watt lived in Handsworth and is chiefly remembered as the inventor of the separate condenser, the greatest single improvement ever made to the steam engine. In 1774, Matthew Boulton applied his engineering talent to realising Watt's idea. It was to follow that Boulton and Watt became one of the most famous partnerships in industrial history. William Murdoch, another engineer, perfected gas lighting and gave the world the high-pressure steam engine, and became a partner of Boulton and Watt.

All three are remembered by monuments in the core of the church. On the north wall of the sanctuary is a marble bust of Matthew Boulton, set in a circular opening above two putti, one holding an engraving of the Soho Manufactory. This was commissioned by Boulton's son, from the sculptor John Flaxman. On the wall opposite, below a pointed arch, is a stone bust of William Murdoch, spelled with a 'ck' — different from his own spelling. James Watt was buried in the grounds of St Mary's, but expansion of the church placed his tomb inside the church. To the south of the sanctuary, in an austere and serene space built especially for it – The James Watt Memorial Chapel – is a marble statue of Watt by Francis Legatt Chantrey, who regarded his statue of Watt as his favourite.

Conrad Küchler, a German refugee and engraver who worked for Boulton at his Soho Mint and who designed several British coins, was also buried in the churchyard.

Genealogical records

Under the aegis of the Birmingham & Midland Society for Genealogy & Heraldry (BMSGH), who sought it from the Handsworth Historical Society and the congregation of the church, a working group of the Handsworth Historical Society, chaired by Roy Lancelott, worked between March 1980 and March 1984 to create a record of every monument in St Mary's churchyard. This record comprises six volumes, titled Monumental Inscriptions, St Mary's Church Handsworth Birmingham. Photocopies of this record, which contains sketches of various headstones and detailed maps showing their position in the graveyard, are held by the BMSGH Library (Fiche number 11054), Margaret Street, Birmingham, the Society of Genealogists (London), the Archives & Collections section of the Library of Birmingham, and Staffordshire Record Office. Brian Hall observes this piece of research has "brought to light once again the fascinating social history of this side of the emerging City of Birmingham during the Victorian and Edwardian period".

Fewer than a handful of monuments are now visited by relatives of those interred, and three simple headstones commemorating 14 soldiers buried during World War I are tended annually by the Commonwealth War Graves Commission.

Musical connections

Webster Booth (1902–1984), largely remembered today as the duettist partner of Anne Ziegler, joined his two older brothers in the choir of St Mary's. He was considered to be one of the finest British tenors of his generation.

Harry Freeman, the popular music hall performer, was buried in the churchyard in 1922.

Sporting connections
William McGregor (13 April 1846 – 20 December 1911) was the founding member of the Football League, and one-time manager and Club Administrator (then day Chairman), of Aston Villa FC.

See also
Boulton, Watt and Murdoch

References

 Everitt, Allen E. (1876) Handsworth Church and its Surroundings, Birmingham. E. C. Osborne
 Greenoak, Francesca (1985) God's Acre: the flowers and animals of the parish churchyard. London: Orbis
 Tompkins, J. C. H., Rev. (date?) The Parish Church of St Mary, Handsworth: a Brief History and Guide. (26-page booklet published by and available from the Parish)
 Worpole, Ken (1997) The Cemetery in the City. Comedia

External links

St Mary's Parish Website
Neighbouring St Andrew's Church, and the Birmingham Anglican Diocese See link to "OUR FRIENDS"
Handsworth Parish details from UK & Ireland Genealogy website
Parish gazetteer entries for Handsworth, St Mary's from Birmingham & Midland Society for Genealogy & Heraldry
'Digital Handsworth' archive

Tourist attractions in Birmingham, West Midlands
Handsworth
Handsworth
Handsworth
Thomas Rickman buildings
Saint Mary